Dwight Iliff Frye (born Fry; February 22, 1899 – November 7, 1943) was an American character actor of stage and screen. He is best known for his portrayals of neurotic, murderous villains in several classic Universal horror films, such as Renfield in Dracula (1931) and Fritz in Frankenstein (1931).

Biography

Early life and career

Frye was born in Salina, Kansas, and studied for a career in music and first appeared as a concert pianist. In the 1920s, he made his name as a stage actor, often in comedies. In 1924, he played the Son in a production of Luigi Pirandello's Six Characters in Search of an Author.

While he had a few minor comedic roles in silent pictures, with the coming of sound Frye soon became known for playing villains. Frye specialized in the portrayal of mentally unbalanced characters, including his signature role, the madman Renfield in Tod Browning's 1931 version of Dracula. 

Later that same year, he played the hunchbacked assistant Fritz in Frankenstein and Wilmer Cook (the "gunsel") in the first film version of Dashiell Hammett's The Maltese Falcon. He had a featured role in the horror film The Vampire Bat (1933) in which he played Herman, a half-wit suspected of being a killer. He had memorable roles in The Invisible Man (1933) as a reporter, and in The Crime of Dr. Crespi (1935).

In Bride of Frankenstein (1935), he played Karl. The part was originally much more substantive; many of Frye's additional scenes were part of a subplot but were cut to shorten the running time and appease the censors. One of the deleted scenes was that of Karl killing a Burgomaster, portrayed by E. E. Clive. Nothing remains of those scenes except still photographs included in a Universal Studios DVD release of the film. He played similar characters in The Ghost of Frankenstein (1942) and Frankenstein Meets the Wolf Man (1943); another appearance in Son of Frankenstein (1939) was deleted prior to release. Also in the 1930s, he appeared in two films starring James Cagney: The Doorway to Hell (1930), as a hit man, and Something to Sing About (1937), as a fussy hairdresser.

During the early 1940s, Frye alternated between film roles and appearing on stage in a variety of productions ranging from comedies to musicals, as well as appearing in a stage version of Dracula. During World War II, he made a contribution to the war effort by working nights as a tool designer for Lockheed Aircraft.

Death
On November 7, 1943, Frye died of a heart attack at the age of 44 while travelling by bus in Hollywood, a few days before he was scheduled to begin filming the biopic Wilson. He is interred in Glendale's Forest Lawn Memorial Park.

Musical tribute
American rock band Alice Cooper wrote and recorded a tribute track to Dwight Frye entitled "The Ballad of Dwight Fry" (intentionally dropping the last "e") that was included on their 1971 LP Love It to Death. On stage, this song would be portrayed with Cooper in a straitjacket trying to escape, and finally breaking free at the end of the song to strangle the nurse with the ties.

Devil Doll's 1990 album, Eliogabalus, features the photographed likeness of Dwight Frye in one of its booths.

SNFU's 1991 compilation album The Last of the Big Time Suspenders features artwork of Dwight Frye as his "Renfield" character on the front cover.

Filmography

References

Sources

External links

 
 
 

1899 births
1943 deaths
20th-century American male actors
American Christian Scientists
American male film actors
American male stage actors
Burials at Forest Lawn Memorial Park (Glendale)
Deaths from coronary thrombosis
Male actors from Kansas
People from Salina, Kansas